Ned Sheridan (3 January 1842 – 30 November 1923) was an Australian cricketer. He played ten first-class matches for New South Wales between 1867/68 and 1878/79.

See also
 List of New South Wales representative cricketers

References

External links
 

1842 births
1923 deaths
Australian cricketers
New South Wales cricketers
Cricketers from Sydney